Kirill Golubev (born February 1, 1974) is a Soviet and Russian former professional ice hockey forward. He is a one-time Russian Champion.

Awards and honors

References

External links
Biographical information and career statistics from Eliteprospects.com, or The Internet Hockey Database

1974 births
Living people
HC Izhstal players
Ak Bars Kazan players
HC Neftekhimik Nizhnekamsk players
HC CSK VVS Samara players
Krylya Sovetov Moscow players
Neftyanik Almetyevsk players
Russian ice hockey forwards
Sportspeople from Izhevsk